This is a list of 327 species in Oberea, a genus of flat-faced longhorns in the family Cerambycidae.

Oberea species

 Oberea abdominalis Jordan, 1894 c g
 Oberea acuta Gressitt, 1951 c g
 Oberea adumbrata (Tippmann, 1958) c g
 Oberea affinis Leng & Hamilton, 1896 i c g b  (raspberry cane borer)
 Oberea alexandrovi Plavilstshikov, 1921
 Oberea andamana Breuning, 1962 c g
 Oberea andamanica Breuning, 1962 c g
 Oberea angolana Breuning, 1962 c g
 Oberea angolensis Breuning, 1950 c g
 Oberea anguina Pascoe, 1867 c g
 Oberea angustata Pic, 1923 c g
 Oberea annamensis Breuning, 1969 c g
 Oberea annulicornis Pascoe, 1858 c g
 Oberea antennata Franz, 1972 c g
 Oberea anterufa Breuning, 1962 c g
 Oberea apicenigrita Breuning, 1962 c g
 Oberea artocarpi Gardner, 1941 c g
 Oberea assamensis Breuning, 1982 c g
 Oberea aterrima Breuning, 1962 c g
 Oberea atricilla Fairmaire, 1893 c g
 Oberea atricilloides Breuning, 1964 c g
 Oberea atroantennalis Breuning, 1962 c g
 Oberea atropunctata Pic, 1916 c g
 Oberea auricollis Aurivillius, 1922 c g
 Oberea auriventris Breuning, 1962 c g
 Oberea baliana Breuning, 1962 c g
 Oberea balineae Heller, 1915 c g
 Oberea bangueyensis Breuning, 1950 c g
 Oberea baramensis Heyden, 1897 c g
 Oberea batoensis Breuning, 1951 c g
 Oberea bicallosicollis Pic, 1933 c g
 Oberea bicoloricornis Pic, 1915 c g
 Oberea bicoloripennis Breuning, 1950 c g
 Oberea bimaculata (Olivier, 1795) c
 Oberea bimaculicollis Breuning, 1962 c g
 Oberea binotaticollis Pic, 1915 c g
 Oberea birmanica Gahan, 1895
 Oberea bisbimaculata Breuning, 1962 c g
 Oberea bisbipunctata Pic, 1916 c g
 Oberea bisbipunctulata Breuning, 1962 c g
 Oberea bivittata Aurivillius, 1911 c g
 Oberea bootangensis Breuning, 1962 c g
 Oberea breviantennalis Kurihara & N. Ohbayashi, 2006 c g
 Oberea brevithorax Gressitt, 1936 c g
 Oberea callosicollis Breuning, 1962 c g
 Oberea cariniscapus Breuning, 1956 c g
 Oberea caseyi Plavilstshikov, 1926 c g
 Oberea ceylonica Aurivillius, 1921 c g
 Oberea chapaensis Pic, 1928 c g
 Oberea cingulata (Aurivillius, 1914) c g
 Oberea circumscutellaris Breuning, 1962 c g
 Oberea clara Pascoe, 1866 c g
 Oberea compta Pascoe, 1867 c g
 Oberea conicus Wang, Chiang & Zheng, 2002 c g
 Oberea consentanea Pascoe, 1867 c g
 Oberea coxalis Gressitt, 1940 c g
 Oberea curialis Pascoe, 1866 c g
 Oberea curticollis (Pic, 1928) c g
 Oberea curtilineata Pic, 1915 c g
 Oberea davaoensis Breuning, 1962 c g
 Oberea deficiens Casey, 1924 c g b
 Oberea delongi Knull, 1928 i c g b  (poplar twig borer)
 Oberea demissa (Newman, 1842) c g
 Oberea denominata Plavilstshikov, 1926 c g
 Oberea densepilosa Breuning, 1955 c g
 Oberea densepunctata Breuning, 1954 c g
 Oberea densepunctipennis Breuning, 1962 c g
 Oberea depressa (Gebler, 1825) c g
 Oberea difformis Jordan, 1894 c g
 Oberea discoidalis (Jordan, 1894) c g
 Oberea distinctipennis Pic, 1902 c g
 Oberea diversimembris Pic, 1923 c g
 Oberea donceeli Pic, 1907 c g
 Oberea elegantula (Kolbe, 1894) c g
 Oberea elongaticollis Breuning, 1962 c g
 Oberea elongatipennis Pic, 1940 c g
 Oberea erythrocephala (Schrank, 1776) i c g b  (leafy spurge stem boring beetle)
 Oberea erythrostoma Heller, 1915 c g
 Oberea euphorbiae (Germar, 1813) c g
 Oberea ferruginea Thunberg, 1787 c g
 Oberea flava Breuning, 1962 c g
 Oberea flavipennis Kurihara & N. Ohbayashi, 2007 c g
 Oberea flavipes Haldeman, 1847 i c g b
 Oberea flavoantennalis Breuning, 1962 c g
 Oberea flavoantennata Breuning, 1962 c g
 Oberea flavodiscalis Breuning, 1982
 Oberea flavotrigonalis Breuning, 1950 c g
 Oberea florensis Breuning, 1962 c g
 Oberea floresica Breuning, 1962 c g
 Oberea formosana Pic, 1911 c g
 Oberea formososylvia Kurihara & N. Ohbayashi, 2007 c g
 Oberea fulviceps Breuning, 1950 c g
 Oberea fuscicollis Breuning, 1962 c g
 Oberea fuscipennis (Chevrolat, 1852) c g
 Oberea fusciventris Fairmaire, 1895 c g
 Oberea gabunensis Breuning, 1950 c g
 Oberea gracilis (Fabricius, 1801) i c g b  (oak sprout oberea)
 Oberea gracillima Pascoe, 1867 c g
 Oberea griseopennis Schwarzer, 1925
 Oberea grossepunctata Breuning, 1947 c g
 Oberea hanoiensis Pic, 1923 c g
 Oberea hebescens Bates, 1873 c g
 Oberea herzi Ganglbauer, 1887 c g
 Oberea heudei Pic, 1936 c g
 Oberea heyrovskyi Pic, 1927 c g
 Oberea himalayana Breuning, 1971 c g
 Oberea histrionis Pic, 1917 c g
 Oberea holatripennis Breuning, 1982
 Oberea holatripennoides (Löbl & Smetana, 2010) c g
 Oberea holonigra Breuning, 1962 c g
 Oberea humeralis Gressitt, 1939 c g
 Oberea humilis (Fairmaire, 1894) c g
 Oberea inclusa Pascoe, 1858 c g
 Oberea incompleta Fairmaire, 1897 c g
 Oberea infragrisea Breuning, 1978 c g
 Oberea infranigra Breuning, 1962 c g
 Oberea infranigrescens Breuning, 1947 c g
 Oberea infrasericea Breuning, 1951 c g
 Oberea insoluta Pascoe, 1867 c g
 Oberea insperans Pascoe, 1867 c g
 Oberea isigakiana Matsushita, 1941 c g
 Oberea japonica (Thunberg, 1787) c g
 Oberea javana Breuning, 1962 c g
 Oberea javanicola Breuning, 1950 c g
 Oberea jordani Aurivillius, 1923 c g
 Oberea kanarensis Breuning, 1950 c g
 Oberea kandyana Breuning, 1962 c g
 Oberea kangeana Breuning, 1969 c g
 Oberea keyensis Breuning, 1962 c g
 Oberea komiyai Kurihara & Ohbayashi, 2006
 Oberea kostini Danilevsky, 1988 c g
 Oberea kualabokensis Hayashi, 1976 c g
 Oberea kunbirensis Breuning, 1953 c g
 Oberea lacana Pic, 1923 c g
 Oberea laetifica Pascoe, 1867 c g
 Oberea lama Gressitt, 1942 c g
 Oberea laosensis Breuning, 1963 c g
 Oberea lateapicalis Pic, 1939 c g
 Oberea latericollis Breuning, 1962 c g
 Oberea laterinigricollis Breuning, 1976 c g
 Oberea latipenne Gressitt, 1939 c g
 Oberea lepesmiana Breuning, 1956 c g
 Oberea leucothrix Toyoshima, 1982 c g
 Oberea linearis (Linné, 1761) c g
 Oberea longissima Aurivillius, 1907 c g
 Oberea luluensis Breuning, 1950 c g
 Oberea lutea (Thunberg, 1787) c g
 Oberea lyncea Pascoe, 1867 c g
 Oberea macilenta (Newman, 1842) c g
 Oberea maculicollis Lucas, 1842 c g
 Oberea mangalorensis Gardner, 1941
 Oberea manipurensis Breuning, 1962 c g
 Oberea matangensis Breuning, 1962 c g
 Oberea mauritanica Lucas, 1888
 Oberea medioflavoantennalis Breuning, 1962 c g
 Oberea mediofusciventris Breuning, 1962 c g
 Oberea melanocephala (Aurivillius, 1914) c g
 Oberea melanostoma Heller, 1915 c g
 Oberea mentaweiensis Breuning, 1962 c g
 Oberea meridionalis Breuning, 1962 c g
 Oberea micholitzi Heller, 1915 c g
 Oberea mimetica Heller, 1915 c g
 Oberea mixta Bates, 1873 c g
 Oberea monticola Fisher, 1935 c g
 Oberea morio Kraatz, 1879 c g
 Oberea morosa Pascoe, 1867 c g
 Oberea mundula Pascoe, 1867
 Oberea mutata Pascoe, 1867 c g
 Oberea myops Haldeman, 1847 i c g b  (rhododendron stem borer)
 Oberea neavei (Aurivillius, 1914) c g
 Oberea nefasta Pascoe, 1867 c g
 Oberea neptis Pascoe, 1867 c g
 Oberea neutralis Pascoe, 1867 c g
 Oberea nigerrima Breuning, 1950 c g
 Oberea nigrescens Breuning, 1962 c g
 Oberea nigriceps (White, 1844) c g
 Oberea nigripennis Breuning, 1950 c g
 Oberea nigripes Breuning, 1950 c g
 Oberea nigriventris Bates, 1873
 Oberea nigroapiciventris Breuning, 1962 c g
 Oberea nigrobasipennis Breuning, 1950 c g
 Oberea nigrocincta (Aurivillius, 1907) c g
 Oberea nigrofemoralis Breuning, 1950 c g
 Oberea nigrolateralis Breuning, 1950 c g
 Oberea nigrolineata (Aurivillius, 1916) c g
 Oberea nigrolineatipennis Breuning, 1970 c g
 Oberea nigrotibialis Breuning, 1972 c g
 Oberea notata Pic, 1936 c g
 Oberea nyassana Breuning, 1956
 Oberea ocellata Haldeman, 1847 i c g b  (sumac stem borer)
 Oberea octava Schwarzer, 1927 c g
 Oberea oculata (Linné, 1758) c g
 Oberea oculaticollis (Say, 1824) i c g
 Oberea ohbayashii Kurihara, 2009 c g
 Oberea okinawana Kusakabe, 1992 c g
 Oberea opaca Gahan, 1907 c g
 Oberea opacipennis Breuning, 1962 c g
 Oberea ophidiana Pascoe, 1858 c g
 Oberea ornativentris Breuning, 1962 c g
 Oberea orothi Breuning, 1962 c g
 Oberea pagana Harold, 1880 c g
 Oberea palawanensis Breuning, 1962 c g
 Oberea pallida Casey, 1913 c g
 Oberea pallidula Gerstäcker, 1855
 Oberea paraneavei Breuning, 1976 c g
 Oberea pararubetra Breuning, 1965 c g
 Oberea parteflavoantennalis Breuning, 1962 c g
 Oberea partenigricollis Breuning, 1962 c g
 Oberea pedemontana Chevrolat, 1856 c g
 Oberea perspicillata Haldeman, 1847 i c g b  (raspberry cane borer)
 Oberea philippinensis Breuning, 1962 c g
 Oberea phungi Breuning, 1967 c g
 Oberea pictipes Pascoe, 1867 c g
 Oberea pigra (Newman, 1851) c g
 Oberea pontianakensis Breuning, 1962 c g
 Oberea postbrunnea Breuning, 1977 c g
 Oberea posticata Gahan, 1895
 Oberea praedita Pascoe, 1867 c g
 Oberea praelonga Casey, 1913 i c g b
 Oberea praemortua Heyden, 1862 †
 Oberea prateflavoantennalis Breuning, 1961
 Oberea protensa Pascoe, 1867 c g
 Oberea pruinosa Casey, 1913 c g b
 Oberea pseudannulicornis Breuning, 1982 c g
 Oberea pseudobalineae Breuning, 1955 c g
 Oberea pseudolacana Breuning, 1956 c g
 Oberea pseudoneavei Breuning, 1976 c g
 Oberea pseudonigrocincta Breuning, 1962 c g
 Oberea pseudopascoei Breuning, 1950 c g
 Oberea pseudopictipes Breuning, 1962 c g
 Oberea pseudoposticata Breuning, 1962 c g
 Oberea pseudovaricornis Hunt & Breuning, 1956 c g
 Oberea puncticollis Breuning, 1962 c g
 Oberea punctiventris Heller, 1915 c g
 Oberea pupillata (Gyllenhal, 1817) c g
 Oberea quadricallosa LeConte, 1874 i c g b  (western poplar branch borer)
 Oberea quianga Heller, 1915 c g
 Oberea reductesignata Pic, 1916 c g
 Oberea reimschi Breuning, 1962 c g
 Oberea ressli Demelt, 1963 c g
 Oberea rhodesica Breuning, 1953 c g
 Oberea rondoni Breuning, 1965 c g
 Oberea rotundipennis Breuning, 1956 c g
 Oberea rubetra Pascoe, 1858 c g
 Oberea ruficeps Fischer, 1842 c g
 Oberea ruficollis (Fabricius, 1792) i c g b  (sassafras borer)
 Oberea ruficornis Breuning, 1956 c g
 Oberea rufiniventris Breuning, 1968 c g
 Oberea rufiventris Aurivillius, 1914 c g
 Oberea rufoantennalis Breuning, 1962 c g
 Oberea rufomaculata Kono & Tamanuki, 1924
 Oberea rufosternalis Breuning, 1962 c g
 Oberea rufotrigonalis Breuning, 1950 c g
 Oberea sanghirica Breuning, 1962 c g
 Oberea sanguinalis (Kolbe, 1893) c g
 Oberea sansibarica Harold, 1880 c g
 Oberea satoi Kurihara, 2009 c g
 Oberea savioi Pic, 1924
 Oberea schaumi LeConte, 1852 i
 Oberea schaumii LeConte, 1852 c g b  (poplar branch borer)
 Oberea scutellaris Gerstäcker, 1855
 Oberea scutellaroides Breuning, 1947 c g
 Oberea semifusca Breuning, 1962 c g
 Oberea semifuscipennis Breuning, 1950 c g
 Oberea semimaura Pascoe, 1867 c g
 Oberea seminigra Chevrolat, 1841 c g
 Oberea semiorbifera (Aurivillius, 1914) c g
 Oberea semirubra Breuning, 1962 c g
 Oberea senegalensis Breuning, 1962 c g
 Oberea sericeiventris Breuning, 1950 c g
 Oberea shibatai Hayashi, 1962 c g
 Oberea shimomurai Kurihara & N. Ohbayashi, 2007 c g
 Oberea shirahatai Ohbayashi, 1956 c g
 Oberea shirakii Hayashi, 1963 c g
 Oberea silhetica Breuning, 1962 c g
 Oberea sinense Pic, 1902 c g
 Oberea sobosana Ohbayashi, 1956 c g
 Oberea sobrina (Boisduval, 1835) c g
 Oberea strigicollis Gressitt, 1942 c g
 Oberea subabdominalis Breuning, 1962 c g
 Oberea subannulicornis Pic, 1916
 Oberea subbasalis Breuning, 1950 c g
 Oberea subdiscoidalis Lepesme & Breuning, 1952 c g
 Oberea subelongatipennis Breuning, 1955 c g
 Oberea subferruginea Breuning, 1965 c g
 Oberea subneavei Breuning, 1962 c g
 Oberea subnigrocincta Breuning, 1950 c g
 Oberea subsericea Breuning, 1962 c g
 Oberea subsuturalis Breuning, 1954 c g
 Oberea subtenuata Breuning, 1968 c g
 Oberea subteraurea Breuning, 1962 c g
 Oberea subtrigonifera Breuning, 1958 c g
 Oberea subvaricornis Breuning, 1962 c g
 Oberea subviperina Breuning, 1960 c g
 Oberea sumbana Breuning, 1962 c g
 Oberea sumbawana Breuning, 1962 c g
 Oberea sumbawanica Breuning, 1962 c g
 Oberea sumbawensis Breuning, 1962 c g
 Oberea taihokensis Breuning, 1961 g
 Oberea taihokuensis Breuning, 1962 c g
 Oberea taiwana Matsushita, 1933 c g
 Oberea tatsienlui Breuning, 1947 c g
 Oberea taygetana Pic, 1901 c g
 Oberea tenggeriana Breuning, 1963 c g
 Oberea tenuata Pascoe, 1866 c g
 Oberea tetrastigma Gressitt, 1951
 Oberea travancorensis Breuning, 1962 c g
 Oberea tricolor Aurivillius, 1924 c g
 Oberea tricoloricornis Breuning, 1961 c g
 Oberea trigonalis Breuning, 1950 c g
 Oberea trilineata (Chevrolat, 1858) c g
 Oberea tripunctata (Swederus, 1787) i c g b  (dogwood twig borer)
 Oberea truncatipennis Breuning, 1962 c g
 Oberea tsuyukii Kurihara & N. Ohbayashi, 2007 c g
 Oberea ulmicola Chittenden, 1904 c g
 Oberea umebayashii Ohbayashi, 1964 c g
 Oberea unimaculicollis Breuning, 1962 c g
 Oberea uninotaticollis Pic, 1939 c g
 Oberea unipunctata Gressitt, 1939
 Oberea viperina Pascoe, 1858 c g
 Oberea vittata Blessig, 1873
 Oberea walkeri Gahan, 1894 c g
 Oberea wittei Breuning, 1954 c g
 Oberea yaoshana Gressitt, 1942 c g
 Oberea yasuhikoi Kusakabe, 2001 c g
 Oberea yunnana Pic, 1926 c g
 Oberea yunnanensis Breuning, 1947 c g

Data sources: i = ITIS, c = Catalogue of Life, g = GBIF, b = Bugguide.net

References

Oberea